Manchester 62 F.C. is a football club based in Gibraltar. The club was previously known as Manchester United F.C. in honour of the English club Manchester United, having officially changed from the 2013–14 season. The club's crest was altered also to reflect the name change. The club currently plays in the Gibraltar Football League. The club, like all others in the territory, currently play at the Victoria Stadium on Winston Churchill Avenue.

History
The club was founded as Manchester United F.C. in 1962, named in honour of the English club Manchester United by a group of supporters, after the manager Matt Busby gave them permission to use the name. They play in the Gibraltar Football League's First Division. United play their home games in the Victoria Stadium. In 2013, UEFA gave the Gibraltar Football League one place each in the qualifying rounds of both the Europa League and the Champions League, meaning that, for the first time, the two clubs could potentially meet in the same competition.

In June 2022, after years playing as a members-owned amateur club, Manchester 62 was sold to Pittsburgh City United founder Michael Anton Monsour. As part of the takeover, the club announced plans to follow the lead of Pittsburgh City United by mandating protective headgear for its players, subject to approval from the Gibraltar Football Association. 

On 19 February 2023, the club announced that 21-year-old YouTuber Theo Ogden would assume the role of technical director, making Ogden the youngest person to take up the role at a professional European club.

Club names
 1962–2000 : Manchester United (Gibraltar) Football Club.
 2000–2002 : Manchester United Eurobet Football Club.
 2002–2008 : Manchester United (Gibraltar) Football Club.
 2009–2013 : Manchester United Digibet Football Club.
 2013– : Manchester 62 Football Club.

Sponsors
The club is currently sponsored by Cepsa Gib.

Players

Current squad
As of 20 July 2022.''

Out on loan

Intermediate League squad

Honours
Gibraltar Premier Division
Champions: 1975, 1977, 1979, 1980, 1984, 1995, 1999
Gibraltar Second Division
Champions: 1974
Rock Cup
Winners: 1977, 1980, 1997, 2003
GFA Challenge Trophy
Winners: 2021–22

References

External links

 

Football clubs in Gibraltar
Gibraltar National League clubs
1962 establishments in Gibraltar
Association football clubs established in 1962